Bobbyzio Moore (born in 1959 Minneapolis, Minnesota as Robert Eldon Arthur Moore), is a Saxophonist, Keyboardist, guitarist, Bass Guitarist, Vocalist, Songwriter and Arranger.

Bobbyzio grew up in Minneapolis where he pursued a recording career, with The Robert Moore Group, and Skogie. In 1976 he relocated to Hollywood, California.  He co-founded the bands The Kats, The Nu Kats, Boy, with his brother Freddy Moore.
In the 1980s Bobbyzio recorded as a session musician and received 2 Platinum Album Awards. In the 1990s he formed the band Bobbyzio to showcase his songwriting talent.

Discography 

 No Driving On Sundays – Starship Records by The Robert Moore Group – 1974
 L.A. In – (compilation) Rhino Records featuring The Kats – 1979
 Get Modern – Infinity Records by The Kats – 1979
 Plastic Facts – Rhino Records by The Nu Kats – 1980
 Yes Nukes – (compilation) Rhino Records featuring The Nu Kats – 1981
 Parasite – (Film Soundtrack) featuring Boy – 1982
 Next Door – RadioActive Records  by Boy – 1983
 Scarred – (Film Soundtrack) featuring Boy/The Nu Kats – 1984
 Spring Fever – (Film Soundtrack) featuring The Nu Kats – 1985
 Loose Screws (Film Soundtrack) featuring – The Nu Kats – 1985
 Beverly Hills Cop (Film Soundtrack) –  1985
 Ghostbusters (Film Soundtrack) –  1984
 Home - Reprise by BoDeans – 1989

Filmography 
I'm A Kat (1979) United Artists Pictures - Using an experimental 70mm 3D filming technique.
It's Not A Rumor (1981) Director: Philip Brewin Cheney, Cinematographer: Jan de Bont.

Videography 
Lost My TV Guide (1979) Hollywood Heartbeat - Pre-MTV rock television series.

Related Web sites 
The Robert Moore Group
Skogie
The Kats
The Nu Kats
Boy

Musicians from Minneapolis
American male singers
American rock singers
Living people
1955 births
Singers from Minnesota
Guitarists from Minnesota
American male bass guitarists
20th-century American bass guitarists
20th-century American male musicians